The 2006 Islington Council election took place on 4 May 2006 to elect members of Islington London Borough Council in London, England. The whole council was up for election and the Liberal Democrats lost overall control of the council to no overall control.

Election result
The results saw the Liberal Democrats lose their majority on the council, after the Labour party made a gain of 12 seats. The Green Party meanwhile gained a seat on the council.

Ward results
* - Existing Councillor seeking re-election.

References

2006
2006 London Borough council elections